The Kentucky–Illinois–Tennessee League (or KITTY League) was a Class D level minor league baseball circuit that went through six different periods of play between 1903 and 1955. The League hosted teams in 29 cities from the states of Illinois, Indiana, Kentucky, Missouri and Tennessee.

History
The first KITTY League played from 1903 through 1906. The next one ran from 1910 through 1914. The third try played the 1916 season. The circuit was revived in 1922 and lasted three years. The fifth KITTY League lasted the longest, playing from 1935 through 1955 with a break from 1943 to 1945 due to World War II. The league was also known briefly as the Kentucky–Indiana–Tennessee League, for during this time the league contained teams such as the Evansville Yankees from Evansville, Indiana. Unlike most leagues that were dormant for years in between playing, the KITTY was much the same from 1903 to 1955, through its inactive years. Clifton C. Gosnell was league president in 1906, after which the league stopped playing, and was president in 1910–1911 when play resumed. Then Dr. Frank H. Bassett was league president 1912–1914, 1916, 1922–1924, and 1935–1937, through the active times and the inactive. Hopkinsville, Kentucky was represented for 28 of the 31 active seasons of the KITTY League, while Paducah, Kentucky made it for 23.

League name revived

In 2004, the league moniker was reincarnated, as a summer collegiate baseball league called the "KIT League" was formed. Members of the KIT League featured some of the former KITTY League cities, who formed teams and revived their previous monikers, such as the Fulton Railroaders, Owensboro Oilers and Union City Greyhounds. The KIT League is now defunct, with the teams having evolved to form the currently active ten–team Ohio Valley League in 2010.

Media
The league history was the subject of a book. The Kitty League was written by Joshua Maxwell and Kevin McCann and published in 2012.

All former teams (1903–1906, 1910–1914, 1916, 1922–1924, 1935–1942, 1946–1955)

Bowling Green, Kentucky
*Bowling Green Barons 1939–1942 
Cairo, Illinois
*Cairo Egyptians 1903, 1912–1914, 1922–1924, 1946–1948
*Cairo Champions 1904
*Cairo Giants 1905–1906 
*Cairo Dodgers 1949–1950 
Central City, Kentucky
*Central City Reds 1954 
Clarksville, Tennessee
*Clarksville Villagers 1903
*Clarksville Grays 1904
*Clarksville Volunteers 1910, 1913, 1916
*Clarksville Billies 1911
*Clarksville Rebels 1912
*Clarksville Boosters 1914
*Clarksville Owls 1946
*Clarksville Colts 1947
*Clarksville Cats 1948–1949
Danville, Illinois
*Danville Old Soldiers 1906
Dawson Springs, Kentucky
*Dawson Springs Resorters 1916 
Dyersburg, Tennessee
*Dyersburg Forked Deers 1923–1924 
Evansville, Indiana
*Evansville Yankees 1912 
Fulton, Kentucky
*Fulton Colonels 1911 
*Fulton Railroaders 1922–1924, 1949–1951
*Fulton Eagles 1936–1938
*Fulton Tigers 1939–1942 
*Fulton Chicks 1946–1948
*Fulton Lookouts 1952–1955
Harrisburg, Illinois
*Harrisburg Merchants 1910
*Harrisburg Miners 1911
*Harrisburg Coal Miners 1913
Henderson, Kentucky 
*Henderson Hens 1903, 1905, 1911–1914, 1916
*Henderson Blue Birds 1904 
Hopkinsville, Kentucky
*Hopkinsville Hoppers 1903, 1910–1914, 1916, 1922–1923, 1935–1942, 1946–1954  
*Hopkinsville Browns 1904 
Jackson, Tennessee
*Jackson Railroaders 1903 
*Jackson Climbers 1911 
*Jackson Blue Jays 1924 
*Jackson Generals 1935–1942, 1950–1954
Jacksonville, Illinois
*Jacksonville Jacks 1906 
Lexington, Tennessee
*Lexington Giants 1935–1938 
Madisonville, Kentucky
*Madisonville Miners 1916, 1922, 1946–1955  
Mattoon, Illinois & Charleston, Illinois
*Mattoon-Charleston Canaries 1906 
Mayfield, Kentucky
*Mayfield Pantsmakers 1922–1924 
*Mayfield Clothiers 1936–1938, 1946–1955 
*Mayfield Browns 1939–1941 
McLeansboro, Illinois
*McLeansboro Miners 1910–1911 
Milan, Tennessee & Trenton, Tennessee
*Milan-Trenton Twins 1923 
Owensboro, Kentucky
*Owensboro Distillers 1903, 1914, 1916 
*Owensboro Pirates 1936
*Owensboro Oilers 1937–1942, 1946–1955  
Paducah, Kentucky
*Paducah Chiefs 1903, 1912–1913, 1951–1955  
*Paducah Indians 1904–1906, 1910, 1914, 1922–1923, 1936–1941 
*Paducah Polecats 1911 
*Paducah Red Birds 1935
Paris, Tennessee
*Paris Travelers 1922
*Paris Parisians 1923–1924 
Portageville, Missouri
*Portageville Pirates 1935–1936 
Princeton, Kentucky
*Princeton Infants 1905
Springfield, Tennessee
*Springfield Blanket Makers 1923
Trenton, Tennessee
*Trenton Reds 1922
Union City, Tennessee
*Union City Greyhounds 1935–1942, 1946-1952
*Union City Dodgers 1953–1955
Vincennes, Indiana
*Vincennes Alices 1903–1906, 1910, 1913
*Vincennes Hoosiers (1911)

Championship titles

1903 – Cairo Egyptians
1904 – Paducah Indians
1905 – Paducah Indians
1906 – Vincennes Alices
1910 – McLeansboro Miners / Vincennes Alices
1911 – Fulton Colonels / Hopkinsville Hoppers
1912 – Clarksville Rebels
1913 – Paducah Chiefs
1914 – Cairo Egyptians
1916 – Clarksville Volunteers
1922 – Mayfield Pantsmakers
1923 – Mayfield Pantsmakers
1924 – Dyersburg Forked Deers
1935 – None declared
1936 – Union City Greyhounds
1937 – Mayfield Clothiers
1938 – Jackson Generals 
1939 – Bowling Green Barons
1940 – Jacksonville Generals
1941 – Mayfield Browns
1942 – Fulton Tigers
1946 – Owensboro Oilers
1947 – Hopkinsville Hoppers
1948 – Union City Greyhounds
1949 – Madisonville Miners
1950 – Mayfield Clothiers
1951 – Fulton Railroaders
1952 – Madisonville Miners
1953 – Paducah Chiefs
1954 – Union City Dodgers
1955 – Paducah Chiefs

References

External links
KITTY League – History of the original professional league
KIT League – Collegiate summer league

 
Defunct professional sports leagues in the United States
Defunct minor baseball leagues in the United States
Baseball leagues in Kentucky
Baseball leagues in Missouri
Baseball leagues in Indiana
Baseball leagues in Illinois
Baseball leagues in Tennessee